DNA-directed RNA polymerase III subunit RPC10 is an enzyme that in humans is encoded by the POLR3K gene.

This gene encodes a small essential subunit of RNA polymerase III, the polymerase responsible for synthesizing transfer and small ribosomal RNAs in eukaryotes. 

The carboxy-terminal domain of this subunit shares a high degree of sequence similarity to the carboxy-terminal domain of an RNA polymerase II elongation factor. This similarity in sequence is supported by functional studies showing that this subunit is required for proper pausing and termination during transcription.

References

Further reading